Gopeng may refer to:
Gopeng
Gopeng (federal constituency), represented in the Dewan Rakyat
Gopeng (state constituency), formerly represented in the Perak State Legislative Assembly (1959–86)